Aud the Deep-Minded (), also known as Unn, Aud Ketilsdatter or Unnur Ketilsdottir, was a 9th-century settler during the age of Settlement of Iceland.

Biography
Aud was the second daughter of Ketill Flatnose, a Norwegian hersir, and Yngvid Ketilsdóttir, daughter of Ketill Wether, a hersir from Ringerike. Aud married Olaf the White (Oleif), son of King Ingjald, who had named himself King of Dublin after going on voyages to Britain and then conquering the shire of Dublin. They had a son named Thorstein the Red. After Oleif was killed in battle in Ireland, Aud and Thorstein journeyed to the Hebrides. Thorstein married there and had six daughters and one son. He also became a great warrior king, conquering in northern Scotland; however, he was killed in battle after being betrayed by his people.

Upon learning of the death of Thorstein, Aud, who was then at Caithness, commissioned a construction of a knarr, a Viking era ship commonly built for Atlantic voyages. She had the ship built secretly in the forest, for unknown reasons. After its completion, Aud captained the ship to Orkney.  There she married off one of her granddaughters, Groa, the daughter of Thorstein the Red, and then Aud captained the ship on its sail to the area of Breiðafjörður in Iceland.

On her ship were twenty men under her command, proving that she was respected, capable, independent and strong-willed.  In addition to the crew, there were other men on her ship, prisoners from Viking raids near and around the British Isles. Aud gave these men their freedom once they were in Iceland, making them freed-men, a class between slave and free, where they were not owned but did not have all the rights of a free-born man. She also gave them land to farm and upon which they could make a living. One of these men so rewarded was Vifil, who was given Vifilsdal, part of Hvammur í Skeggjadal, the area in which Aud settled. When Aud arrived in the western region of Iceland, she claimed all the land in Dalasýsla between the  rivers Dagverdara and Skraumuhlaupsa for her family. Unlike most early Icelandic settlers, Aud was a baptized Christian and is commonly credited with bringing Christianity to Iceland. Aud erected crosses where she could pray on a prominent hill within her lands, now known as Krossholar (Krosshólaborg).

The cause of Aud's journeying has been debated. Other accounts say that Olaf the White (aka Olaf of Dublin and Olaf Guthfrithsson of Vestfold) was not killed in Ireland, and returned to Norway in 871 to regain control of his father's kingdom. Icelandic tradition states that Ketil Flatnose died in the Scottish Isles, and the collapse of his family's fortune was complete with the slaying of Ketil's grandson, Thorstein the Red. Upon the death of Aud's son, Thorstein, “She felt, according to Laxdoela Saga, she did not have much chance of recovering her position”, and she commissioned a ship to be built secretly in the woods, and assembled her entire kin, her slaves and some of her family friends and led an expedition via Orkney and the Faroes to find a new life in her old age.

Primary sources
Aud figures in several Norse sagas, including Landnámabók, Njáls saga, Laxdæla saga, Eyrbyggja saga, Eiríks saga rauða and Grettis saga.

Twelfth and thirteenth century Icelandic writers commonly believed that their country had been settled by Norwegians of noble birth who had been persecuted in Norway. The problem that dogged medieval Icelandic historiography was an understandable desire to avoid the charge that the country had been founded by a group of unruly Scottish booty Vikings. However, it is no longer possible to dismiss these tales of Auður and her father Ketill as unverifiable oral traditions, as this Scottish tradition in Icelandic oral history is of far greater antiquity than the thirteenth century saga age. The National Museum of Iceland contains an impressive collection of somewhat debased penannular brooches and pins of undoubted Celtic provenance from the ninth and tenth centuries which would fit well in the context of the Hebridean Norse–Gael.

Portrayal 

A loosely based Aud, also daughter of Ketill Flatnose and involved with the settlement of Iceland, is portrayed by Leah McNamara in the 5th season of the historical drama television series Vikings.
Also, portrayed briefly, with family links, as the 'ancestress of most Icelanders' in the 1992 science fiction anthology 'Tales of Riverworld' Ed. Philip Jose Farmer, in the story 'crossing the dark river' by the same author.
Aud is the main character in a trilogy of novels by Icelandic author Vilborg Davíðsdóttir: Auður (2009), Vígroði (2010), and Blóðug jörð (2017). Aud is also a playable character in the Paradox grand strategy game Crusader Kings 3 where she is already ruling over western Iceland in the year 867 AD.

See also
Laxardal

References

Other sources
Crawford, Barbara  (1987) Scandinavian Scotland  (Leicester University Press) 
Jochens, Jenny (1995) Women in Old Norse Society (Ithaca: Cornell University Press) 
Jones, Gwyn (1984) A History of the Vikings  (London: Oxford Univ. Press) 
León, Vicki (1998) Outrageous Women of the Middle Ages (John Wiley & Sons) 
Sigurðsson, Gísli  (2004) The Medieval Icelandic Saga and Oral Tradition: A Discourse on Method (Cambridge, MA: Harvard University Press)

Related reading
Naomi Mitchison (1955) The Land the Ravens Found  (Collins) 
Vilborg Davíðsdóttir (2009) Auður (Mál og menning)

External links
Audur Ketilsdóttir

9th-century Christians
9th-century Icelandic people
9th-century Icelandic women
Female sailors
Icelandic Christians
Sea captains
Norwegian Christians
Norwegian shipbuilders